The 1998 Tour de Romandie was the 52nd edition of the Tour de Romandie cycle race and was held from 5 May to 10 May 1998. The race started in Rheinfelden and finished in Geneva. The race was won by Laurent Dufaux of the Festina team.

General classification

References

1998
Tour de Romandie